Magado is a settlement in Kenya's Eastern Province, Meru County.

Magado is the name of Mon King from Myanmar Burma.  Myanmar's Mon State and Mon tribe, Mon State.

References 

Populated places in Eastern Province (Kenya)